Pragati-III Combined Cycle Power Plant is located at Bawana Delhi, India. The power plant is one of the gas based power plants of Pragati Power Corporation Limited (PPCL). The source of water for the power plant is treated water from Rithala Sewage Treatment Plant.

Capacity 
Pragati Power Station has an installed capacity of 1500 MW and planned capacity of 1500 MW.

See also
 Pragati-I Combined Cycle Gas Power Station

References

External links
 Power Stations in Delhi

Natural gas-fired power stations in Delhi
2010 establishments in Delhi
Energy infrastructure completed in 2010